Carlos Eduardo is a masculine Portuguese given name. Notable people with the name include:

Carlos Eduardo (fighter), known as Cachorrão, (born 1981), Brazilian mixed martial artist
Carlos Eduardo de Castro Lourenço, known as Rincón, (born 1987), Brazilian footballer
Carlos Eduardo Castro da Silva, known as Cadu, (born 1982), Brazilian footballer
Carlos Eduardo Ferrari, known as Caca, (born 1979), Brazilian footballer
Carlos Eduardo (footballer, born 1996), Brazilian footballer
Carlos Eduardo de Fiori Mendes, known as Cadu, (born 1986), Brazilian footballer
Carlos Eduardo Gallardo, Guatemalan footballer
Carlos Eduardo Gutiérrez, Uruguayan footballer
Carlos Eduardo Lopes, known as Du Lopes, (born 1980), Brazilian footballer
Carlos Eduardo (footballer, born 1992), Brazilian footballer
Carlos Eduardo (footballer, born 1993), Brazilian footballer
Carlos Eduardo Marangon, known as Edu Marangon, (born 1963), Brazilian footballer and manager
Carlos Eduardo (footballer, born 1980), Brazilian footballer
Carlos Eduardo (footballer, born 1987), Brazilian footballer
Carlos Eduardo (footballer, born 1989), Brazilian footballer
Carlos Eduardo Peruena Rodríguez, Uruguayan footballer
Carlos Eduardo Rocha, known as Tá Danado, (born 1981), Brazilian mixed martial artist
Carlos Eduardo Santos Oliveira, known as Eduardo, (born 1986), Brazilian footballer
Carlos Eduardo Salazar, Colombian footballer
Carlos Eduardo Schneider, known as Duda, Brazilian footballer
Carlos Eduardo da Silva, known as Zumbi, (born 1980), Brazilian footballer
Carlos Eduardo Soares, known as Ataliba, (born 1979), Brazilian footballer
Carlos Eduardo de Souza Tomé, known as Dudu Paraíba, (born 1985), Brazilian footballer
Carlos Eduardo Ventura, known as Duda, (born 1974), Brazilian footballer
Carlos Eduardo (footballer, born 2001), Brazilian footballer

Portuguese masculine given names
Spanish masculine given names